Bapianga Deogracias "Grace" Tanda (born 29 January 1994) is a Congolese professional footballer. Nicknamed "Grace", Tanda is a proficient striker, possessing great speed, physic and technique in his game.

Club career

Early career 
Tanda began his club career with Ope IF, in 2011 Tanda transferred to Östersunds FK B team, for which he played in Division 4.In Östersunds FK Second team Tanda scored 12 goals in two seasons.  Before the 2014 season, he got sign by the division 2 team IFK Östersund.  After only half a season in IFK Östersund with many good performance in the division 2. He was recruited by Östersunds FK in the summer of 2014 to compete in Superettan. Graham Potter and Billy Reid saw that there was a lot of potential in Tanda and wanted him to sign with Östersunds FK.

Östersunds FK 
He made his debut in the Superettan on October 25, 2014, in a 2–1 home loss against Assyriska FF, where Tanda was replaced by Luka Peric in the 87th minute. On November 2, 2014, Tanda played his first match from the start and scored his first Superettan goal in a 2-2 match against Ängelholms FF.

Skellefteå FF 
In 2016 Tanda was loaned out full season to the division 2 team Skellefteå FF after coming back from a ligament injury. he played 26 games and score 11 and assisted 14.  With his eleven goals in division II, Grace Tanda Skellefteå was FF's sharpest goal scorer in 2016.

Motala AIF FF 
In 2017, Tanda signed one-year contract with Division II team Motala AIF FF and he scored 10 goals in 24 league games.

BK Forward 
On 2018 the former Östersunds FK player got recruited by the division 1 team BK Forward. Tanda played 30 games for the Örebro team and scored 14 goal. He was rumoured to sign with the Superettan team Landskrona Bois summer 2018 after his performance with BK Forward but remained at the club to the end of the season.

Gefle IF 
On January 11, 2019 Tanda signed for the ancient club Gefle IF he scored 8 goals in 26 games. after the season

Thanh Hoa Fc 
Tanda left Gefle if and signed for the V.league 1 team Thanh Hoa Fc in Vietnam. after only 2 games both parties made an agreement to end the contract after the club had put too much pressure on Tanda.

CLB SHB Da Nang  
In March 2020, he signed for another V.league1 team and this time for the former V.league 1 champions CLB SHB Da Nang.

Grace Tanda has shown a better integration with SHB in Danang. Currently, the Swedish striker has 4 goals and 3 assist in 9 games, with Phan Van Long becoming the two best scorer. Perhaps also because of this, Tanda has caught the eye of some teams in both Asia and Europe.

International career 
In summer 2015 made his debut for Congo national football team U23 against France U23 in a friendly match in Centre Technique de la Ligue du Midi-Pyrénées de Castelmourou. a France team in full preparation for the Euro. Congo lost by 2–0. Tanda started the match.

References

1994 births
Living people
Democratic Republic of the Congo footballers
Association football midfielders
Association football forwards
IFK Östersund players
Östersunds FK players
Skellefteå FF players
Motala AIF players
BK Forward players
Gefle IF players
IFK Luleå players
Al-Suqoor FC players
Democratic Republic of the Congo expatriate footballers
Expatriate footballers in Sweden
Expatriate footballers in Saudi Arabia
Democratic Republic of the Congo expatriate sportspeople in Sweden
Democratic Republic of the Congo expatriate sportspeople in Saudi Arabia
Expatriate footballers in Vietnam
Ettan Fotboll players
Superettan players
V.League 1 players
Saudi Second Division players
21st-century Democratic Republic of the Congo people